Foveran Castle was a 12th- or 13th-century castle, about  south -ast of Ellon, Aberdeenshire, Scotland, at Foveran,  west of the mouth of River Ythan.
It may also be known as Turing's Tower, or replace that castle.

History
The Turings were the owners of the site.  The castle collapsed around 1720.  The site was acquired by Forbes of Tolquhoun around 1750.

Structure 
There is no longer any trace of the castle.  It appears that the arch over a spring, which was thought to have been at the base of the northern exterior wall, remained up to the 1866.

Tradition
Thomas the Rhymer is said to have prophesied:

When Turing's Tower falls to the land

Gladsmuir shall be near at hand;

When Turing's Tower falls to the sea,

Gladsmuir the next year shall be.

It is suggested that this relates to the Battle of Prestonpans, sometimes known as the Battle of Gladsmuir.

Castles in Great Britain and Ireland
List of castles in Scotland

References

Castles in Aberdeenshire